The 2022 United States Senate election in Louisiana was held on November 8, 2022, to elect a member of the United States Senate to represent the State of Louisiana. Incumbent Republican U.S. senator John Kennedy was first elected in 2016. He ran for re-election to a second term, and was re-elected after receiving a majority of votes in the first round.

Kennedy won White voters (79% to 9%), while Chambers and Mixon had a split majority of African Americans (48% to 24% to 16%).

Candidates

Republican Party

Declared
Devin Lance Graham, business owner and real estate broker
John Kennedy, incumbent U.S. Senator

Democratic Party

Declared
MV "Vinny" Mendoza, perennial candidate
Luke Mixon, member of the U.S. Navy Reserve and former member of the U.S. Navy
Syrita Steib, nonprofit executive and criminal justice reform advocate
Salvador P. Rodriguez, store manager

Declined
John Bel Edwards, Governor of Louisiana (endorsed Mixon)
Helena Moreno, President of the New Orleans City Council and former state representative (endorsed Chambers)

Libertarian Party 
Aaron C. Sigler, neurosurgeon and candidate for U.S. Senate in 2020

Non-Partisans and Independents

Declared
Beryl A. Billiot, businessman and perennial candidate
Alexander "Xan" John, businessman, law student and candidate for U.S. Senate in 2020
Bradley McMorris, realtor
W. Thomas La Fontaine Olson, an author, advocate and 2020 U.S. House candidate in Illinois
Thomas Wenn

Endorsements

General election

Predictions

Polling

Runoff election
Generic Republican vs. generic Democrat

Results

See also 
 2022 United States Senate elections
 2022 Louisiana elections

Notes

References

External links 
Official campaign websites
 Gary Chambers Jr. (D) for Senate
 Devin Graham (R) for Senate
 John Kennedy (R) for Senate
 Luke Mixon (D) for Senate
 Syrita Steib (D) for Senate

2022
Louisiana
United States Senate